Parkville station may refer to:

Parkville railway station, Australia
Parkville station (Connecticut), U.S.
United States Post Office (Bensonhurst, Brooklyn), also known as Parkville Station